Bazemore may refer to 
Bazemore, Alabama, a small community in the United States
Bazemore–Hyder Stadium in Georgia, U.S.
King-Casper-Ward-Bazemore House in North Carolina, U.S.
Bazemore (surname)